The 2021 Córdoba Open was a men's tennis tournament played on outdoor clay courts. It was the third edition of the Córdoba Open, and part of the ATP Tour 250 series of the 2021 ATP Tour. It took place at the Estadio Mario Alberto Kempes in Córdoba, Argentina, from 20 February until 28 February 2021.

Finals

Singles 

  Juan Manuel Cerúndolo def.  Albert Ramos Viñolas, 6–0, 2–6, 6–2.

Doubles 

  Rafael Matos /  Felipe Meligeni Alves def.  Romain Arneodo /  Benoît Paire, 6–4, 6–1.

Points and prize money

Point distribution

Prize money 

*per team

Singles main-draw entrants

Seeds

1 Rankings are as of February 8, 2021

Other entrants
The following players received wildcards into the singles main draw:
  Francisco Cerúndolo
  Nicolás Jarry
  Nicolás Kicker

The following players received entry from the qualifying draw:
  Facundo Bagnis
  Marcelo Tomás Barrios Vera
  Juan Manuel Cerúndolo
  Tomás Martín Etcheverry

The following player received entry as a lucky loser:
  João Menezes

Withdrawals
Before the tournament
  Pablo Andújar → replaced by  Thiago Seyboth Wild
  Salvatore Caruso → replaced by  Andrej Martin
  Pablo Cuevas → replaced by  Jozef Kovalík
  Laslo Đere → replaced by  Hugo Dellien
  Pedro Martínez → replaced by  Daniel Elahi Galán
  Guido Pella → replaced by  João Menezes

Doubles main-draw entrants

Seeds

1 Rankings are as of January 25, 2021

Other entrants
The following pairs received wildcards into the doubles main draw:
  Facundo Bagnis /  Máximo González
  Oliver Marach /  Agustín Velotti

Withdrawals 
Before the tournament
  Marco Cecchinato /  Guido Pella → replaced by  Thiago Monteiro /  Fernando Romboli
  Salvatore Caruso /  Máximo González → replaced by  Federico Delbonis /  Juan Ignacio Londero
  Pablo Andújar /  Pedro Martínez → replaced by  Federico Coria /  Hugo Dellien
  Pablo Cuevas /  Oliver Marach → replaced by  Rafael Matos /  Felipe Meligeni Alves

References

External links 
Official website

2021
2021 ATP Tour
2021 in Argentine tennis
February 2021 sports events in Argentina